Materials Chemistry and Physics (including Materials Science Communications) is a peer-reviewed scientific journal published 18 times per year by Elsevier. The focus of the journal is interrelationships among structure, properties, processing and performance of materials. It covers conventional and advanced materials. Publishing formats are short communications, full-length papers and feature articles. The editors-in-chief are Sam Lap Ip Chan (University of New South Wales) and Kwang Lung Lin (National Cheng Kung University).

According to the Journal Citation Reports, the journal has a 2020 impact factor of 4.094, ranking it 125th out of 333 in the category of Materials Science.

Abstracting and indexing 
This journal is abstracted and indexed by:

References

External links 
 

Materials science journals
English-language journals
Publications established in 1983
Elsevier academic journals